St Mark's Church, Barnet Vale is the Church of England parish church for Barnet Vale. It is located in the Diocese of St Albans. 
It is a Grade II listed building.

Building 

The church building began as the work of John Loughborough Pearson in a neo-perpendicular Gothic style, but was completed after his death. A red brick chancel with tiled roofs was later included. A bricked-up entrance exists for the tower which was never built. The church contains fittings designed by William Butterfield.

Memorials 

The south porch contains three niches with ogee hoods containing three statues by Nathaniel Hitch, one of which is dedicated to Lieutenant Cyril Catford.

References

External links 

Church of England church buildings in the London Borough of Barnet
Diocese of St Albans
Grade II listed buildings in the London Borough of Barnet